"Rinse & Repeat" is a song by British DJ Riton featuring vocals from Kah-Lo. The song was released as a digital download in the United Kingdom on 19 February 2016.

The song entered the UK Singles Chart at number 13 and at number 2 on the UK Dance Chart. It was nominated for Best Dance Recording at the 2017 Grammy Awards.

Charts

Release history

References

2016 singles
2016 songs
Riton (musician) songs
Song articles with missing songwriters